Mali competed in the Olympic Games for the first time at the 1964 Summer Olympics in Tokyo, Japan.

References
Official Olympic Reports

Nations at the 1964 Summer Olympics
1964